Monstrum (Korean: 물괴) is a 2018 South Korean period action film directed by Heo Jong-ho. It stars Kim Myung-min, Kim In-kwon, Lee Hye-ri and Choi Woo-shik. The film was released on September 12, 2018. It was chosen to compete in the Sitges International Fantastic Film Festival, screening there on 13 October.

Plot
Set in 1527 during King Jungjong's reign where plague is spreading in Joseon and rumors are rife that a mysterious vicious creature called "Monstrum" is roaming around the country.

Cast
Kim Myung-min as Yun-kyum
Kim In-kwon as Sung-han
Lee Hye-ri as Myung  
 Joo Ye-rim as child Myung
Choi Woo-shik as Hur
Park Hee-soon as King Jungjong 
Lee Geung-young as Sim Woon
Park Sung-woong as Jin-yong 
Lee Kyu-bok as Mo-gae 
Kim Min-seok
Hong Ji-yoon as Mother
Lee Do-kyung 
Han So-yeong
Soo Mi

Production 
Principal photography began on April 10, 2017. Production ended in Yangpyeong County of Gyeonggi Province on July 21, 2017. Filming took place in various locations such as Paju, Yangju, Gwangju City and South Gyeongsang Province.

Release 
The film was released domestically on September 12, 2018, on 1,183 screens. The film received age 15-rating for violence, bloody images, and some frightening sequences. The film was set to be released in VOD service and digital download on October 8, 2018.

Reception

Critical response 
Shim Sun-ah from Yonhap News Agency gave a mixed review and wrote, "Monstrum is the first creature action movie set in the Joseon era and has a suspenseful and entertaining premise, but it is ruined by a predictable plot. One highlight of this film is the design of the monster and splashy special effects. On another positive note, the movie constantly arouses the curiosity of viewers regarding the identity of the strange monster recorded in history, the secret behind the creature and, most importantly, whether the creature's existence is true or not."

At the 2018 Sitges International Fantastic Film Festival, the film won the Panorama Fantàstic Audience Award.

Box office 
The film finished first place on its opening day, attracting 105,255 moviegoers with  gross, placing Searching and new release The Predator on the second and third place respectively. The film continued to top the box office on its second day of release.

As of October 4, 2018, the film earned  from 720,721 total attendance.

References

External links
 
 
 
 

2010s monster movies
2010s historical action films
2018 films
South Korean historical action films
Films set in the Joseon dynasty
2010s South Korean films
Lotte Entertainment films